
Gmina Sława is an urban-rural gmina (administrative district) in Wschowa County, Lubusz Voivodeship, in western Poland.

Villages
Apart from the town of Sława, Gmina Sława contains the villages and settlements of Bagno, Cegłówko, Ciepielówek, Ciosaniec, Dąb, Dębczyn, Dębowo, Droniki, Głuchów, Gola, Jutrzenka, Kamienna, Krążkowo, Krępina, Krzepielów, Krzydłowiczki, Kuźnica Głogowska, Lipinki, Lubiatów, Lubogoszcz, Łupice, Myszyniec, Nowe Strącze, Przybyszów, Przydroże, Radzyń, Śmieszkowo, Spokojna, Stare Strącze, Szreniawa, Tarnów Jezierny, Tarnówek and Wróblów.

Neighbouring gminas
Gmina Sława is bordered by the gminas of Kolsko, Kotla, Nowa Sól, Przemęt, Siedlisko, Szlichtyngowa, Wijewo, Wolsztyn and Wschowa.

Twin towns – sister cities

Gmina Sława is twinned with:
 Esneux, Belgium
 Luckau, Germany

References

Slawa
Wschowa County